These are the official results of the Women's 4x400 metres event at the 1990 European Championships in Split, Yugoslavia, held at Stadion Poljud on 31 August and 1 September 1990.

Medalists

Results

Final
1 September

Heats
31 August

Heat 1

Heat 2

Participation
According to an unofficial count, 47 athletes from 11 countries participated in the event.

 (4)
 (4)
 (4)
 (4)
 (4)
 (5)
 (4)
 (4)
 (4)
 (5)
 (5)

See also
 1988 Women's Olympic 4 × 400 m Relay (Seoul)
 1991 Women's World Championships 4 × 400 m Relay (Tokyo)
 1992 Women's Olympic 4 × 400 m Relay (Barcelona)
 1993 Women's World Championships 4 × 400 m Relay (Stuttgart)

References

 Results
 

Relay 4 x 400
4 x 400 metres relay at the European Athletics Championships
1990 in women's athletics